Petteri is a Finnish masculine given name, meaning Peter. People with this name include:

 Petteri Forsell (born 1990), Finnish footballer
 Petteri Iivonen (born 1987), Finnish violinist
 Petteri Koponen (born 1988), Finnish professional basketball player
 Petteri Lampinen (born 1975), Finnish bandy player
 Petteri Lax (born 1985), Finnish long jumper
 Petteri Lehtinen (born 1973), Finnish medley swimmer
 Petteri Lehto (born 1961), Finnish ice hockey player
 Petteri Lotila (born 1978), Finnish-born Norwegian ice hockey player
 Petteri Nokelainen (born 1986), Finnish ice hockey player
 Petteri Nummelin (born 1972), Finnish ice hockey player
 Petteri Orpo (born 1969), Finnish politician
 Petteri Pennanen (born 1990), Finnish footballer
 Petteri Rasi Finnish ice hockey player
 Petteri Salomaa (born 1961), Finnish opera singer
 Petteri Silván (born 1972), Finnish enduro rider
 Petteri Similä (born 1990), Finnish ice hockey player
 Petteri Summanen (born 1969), Finnish actor and screenwriter
 Petteri Wirtanen (born 1986), Finnish ice hockey player

See also
 Petteria

Finnish masculine given names